The Trudeau family is a Canadian family, originating from the French colonial period, in what is now Quebec.

Members
Joseph Trudeau (1848–1919), Canadian farm owner
Charles-Émile Trudeau (1887–1935), Canadian businessman and father of Canadian Prime Minister Pierre Trudeau
Pierre Trudeau (1919–2000), 15th Prime Minister of Canada (1968–1979 and 1980–1984)
Margaret Trudeau (b. 1948), divorced wife of Pierre Trudeau
Justin Trudeau (b. 1971), 23rd Prime Minister of Canada (2015–present), son of Pierre Trudeau and Margaret Trudeau 
Sophie Grégoire Trudeau (b. 1975), wife of Justin Trudeau
Alexandre Trudeau (b. 1973), Canadian film-maker, son of Pierre and Margaret
Michel Trudeau (1975–1998), son of Pierre and Margaret, who died in an avalanche

Connected people
James Sinclair (1908–1984), maternal grandfather of Justin Trudeau, father of Margaret Trudeau
William Farquhar (1774–1839), first British resident of Singapore, 5th great-grandfather of Justin Trudeau

Ancestry
The Trudeau family's surname can be traced back to Marcillac-Lanville in France, in the 16th century, and to a Robert Truteau (1544–1589). The lineage in North America was established by Étienne Truteau (1641–1712), in what is now Longueuil (of the Canadian province of Quebec), who arrived in Canada in 1659.

Offices held

Prime Minister of Canada
April 20, 1968 – June 4, 1979
March 3, 1980 – June 30, 1984
November 4, 2015 – present
Leader of the Liberal Party of Canada
April 6, 1968 – June 16, 1984
April 14, 2013 – present
Minister of Justice and Attorney General of Canada
April 4, 1967 – July 5, 1968
President of the Queen's Privy Council for Canada
March 11, 1968 – May 1, 1968
Minister of Intergovernmental Affairs and Youth
November 4, 2015 – July 18, 2018
Member of the Canadian Parliament
November 8, 1965 – June 30, 1984
October 14, 2008 – present

References

See also
Mulroney family

Canadian people of French descent
Roman Catholic families
Trudeau political family